Popular Socialist Party (in French: Parti Socialiste Populaire) was a communist political party in Haiti. PSP was founded in 1946. It was led by Anthony Lespès, and later Étienne Charlier. PSP took part in the presidential elections of 1946.

The party was suppressed by the regime in 1948.

PSP published La Nation.
Banned communist parties
Political parties established in 1946
Communist parties in Haiti
Defunct communist parties
Defunct political parties in Haiti